Robert Willis may refer to:

Sciences and technology 
Robert Willis (physician) (1799–1878), 19th century physician, medical historian and librarian
Robert Willis (engineer) (1800–1875), 19th century engineer, phoneticist, and architectural historian
Robert Willis (hacker), hacker and comic books writer

Sports 
Robert Watson Willis (1843–1892), 19th century footballer and administrator
Bob Willis (footballer) (born 1942), Australian rules footballer 
Bob Willis (1949–2019), English cricketer
Robert Willis (sailor) (born 1987), American Olympic windsurfer

Other 
Robert Willis (diplomat) (1868–1921), English administrator in China
Robert Willis (minister) (1785–1865), Canadian minister 
Bob Willis (trade unionist) (1904–1982), British trade union leader
Bobby Willis (1942–1999), British songwriter
Robert Willis (priest) (born 1947), Church of England priest and current Dean of Canterbury